Susan S. Jacobs is the first person to fill the newly created role of Special Advisor for International Children's Issues.  This new foreign policy position and assignment for Jacobs was created by Secretary of State Hillary Clinton and announced on July 1, 2010.

Jacobs has previously served as a Senior Policy Advisor in the Department of State's Bureau of Consular Affairs. A former U.S. Ambassador to Papua New Guinea, the Solomon Islands and Vanuatu, she also served as Deputy Assistant Secretary for Global Issues in the Bureau of Legislative Affairs. Her Foreign Service career has also included tours in Caracas, Tel Aviv, New Delhi, Bucharest, and San Salvador.

Jacobs graduated from the University of Michigan and later studied at Georgetown University Law School and the George Washington University. She has received the Department of State's Superior and Meritorious Honor Awards, and the U.S. Embassy New Delhi’s Community Achievement Award.

See also
 International child abduction in the United States
 Office of Children's Issues

References

|-

|-

|-

1945 births
Children's rights activists
Living people
University of Michigan alumni
United States Special Envoys
Ambassadors of the United States to Papua New Guinea
Ambassadors of the United States to Vanuatu
Ambassadors of the United States to the Solomon Islands
United States Foreign Service personnel
American women ambassadors
Ambassadors of the United States
21st-century American diplomats
21st-century American women